Omani Arabic (also known as Omani Hadari Arabic) is a variety of Arabic spoken in the Al Hajar Mountains of Oman and in a few neighboring coastal regions. It is the easternmost Arabic dialect. It was formerly spoken by colonists in Kenya and Tanzania, but these days, it mainly remains spoken on the island of Zanzibar. The Gwadari Arabic, a variant of Omani Arabic is also spoken in Gwadar, a former Omani colony.

Phonology

Consonants 

 Velar fricatives  can be heard as uvular sounds , in the Muscat dialect.
  can also be heard as palatalized sounds  among the Muscat dialect.
 As for most [Omani] dialects, Standard Arabic  is replaced with the velar stop  , while  is available in some Omani dialects, mainly Bedouin.

Vowels 

 can be heard as  when preceding  or any non-emphatic consonant. It is heard as back  after emphatic sounds, and can then be heard as  when shortened. Its long equivalent , is heard as  after emphatic sounds.

See also 
 Varieties of Arabic
 Peninsular Arabic

References 

Arabic languages
Arabs in Oman
Mashriqi Arabic
Peninsular Arabic
Languages of Oman